Luther Williams Field is a baseball stadium in Macon, Georgia. It was built in 1929, and is the centerpiece of Central City Park in Macon. It is the home of the Macon Bacon, a wood-bat collegiate summer baseball team in the Coastal Plain League. The original covered grandstand is still in place, though a new tin roof has replaced the former wooden one. A black iron gate surrounds the field, the front of which says "Macon Base Ball Park."

History
Luther Williams Field was home to the Macon Peaches (of the South Atlantic Association, South Atlantic League, and Southern League) on and off from 1929 to the 1980s, and another team by the same name from the Southeastern League in 2003. The Macon Dodgers of the South Atlantic League played at the stadium from 1956 to 1960; the Macon Redbirds in 1983; the Macon Pirates from 1984 to 1987; and the Macon Braves from 1991 to 2002. In 2007, the new South Coast League located its Macon Music franchise at Luther Williams. The team was managed by former major league player Phil Plantier. The General Manager was Ric Sisler, grandson of Baseball Hall of Famer George Sisler.

The venue hosted the 1980 and 1982 Atlantic Sun Conference baseball tournaments, won by Georgia Southern and Hardin–Simmons, respectively.

Luther Williams Field was used for location shooting in the 1976 film The Bingo Long Traveling All-Stars & Motor Kings in which it stood in for a fictional Negro leagues ballpark in St. Louis, Missouri. It was also used as a location in 2012 for two motion pictures, the Harrison Ford movie 42, chronicling the baseball legend Jackie Robinson, and Clint Eastwood's Trouble with the Curve. It was also used to film baseball scenes in the television show Brockmire.

The stadium was named for Macon's mayor at the time of its opening, Luther Williams, whose family had migrated from South Wales, UK in the latter 1800's. Having an ardent love for athletics, he worked to bring baseball to Macon and helped get the stadium built. Originally unnamed and costing $60,000, the city council soon named the new park after Williams.  The first game held there was on April 18, 1929.

Famous players
Numerous Major League stars have played at Luther Williams, whether on their way up the minor league system or as part of Major League teams' occasional stopovers to play their farm teams. Some notable players include:
 Pete Rose (1962 Peaches), MLB all-time hit leader
 Tony Pérez (1963 Peaches), Baseball Hall of Famer
 Vince Coleman (1983 Redbirds), set all-time professional baseball record of 145 stolen bases (since surpassed by Billy Hamilton)
 Chipper Jones (1991 Braves), Baseball Hall of Famer and 1999 National League Most Valuable Player
 Jermaine Dye (1994 Braves), 2005 World Series Most Valuable Player
 Andruw Jones, Sr. (1995 Braves), nine-time Gold Glove Award winner

References

External links

 Luther Williams Field Views – Ball Parks of the Minor Leagues

Sports venues in Georgia (U.S. state)
Minor league baseball venues
Sports venues on the National Register of Historic Places in Georgia (U.S. state)
Baseball venues in Georgia (U.S. state)
Buildings and structures in Macon, Georgia
Negro league baseball venues still standing
Tourist attractions in Macon, Georgia
South Coast League venues
National Register of Historic Places in Bibb County, Georgia